"When icicles hang by the wall", also called Winter's song, is a song from Shakespeare's play "Love's Labour's Lost" (V.2, 933). The poem has been set by composers including Thomas Arne, Ralph Vaughan Williams, Hubert Parry, John Rutter and Ronald Corp and Elsie Bollinger.

References

Poetry by William Shakespeare
Music based on works by William Shakespeare